Whirlwind Tongues is the sixth and final studio album by the Texan rock band Bloodrock released on Capitol Records in February 1974.  Drummer Rick Cobb III was replaced on this release by Randy Reeder.

Track listing
"It's Gonna Be Love" – 3:25
"Sunday Song" – 4:22
"Parallax" – 3:43
"Voices – 3:40
"Eleanor Rigby" – 3:16
"Stilled by Whirlwind Tongues" – 5:39
"Guess What I Am" – 3:00
"Lady of Love" – 3:59
"Jungle" – 4:30

1974 albums
Bloodrock albums
Capitol Records albums